Eric Cobham ( 1700 – 1760 or after) a pirate in the early eighteenth century who with his wife, Maria Lindsey, practiced piracy in the Gulf of St. Lawrence from their base in Newfoundland. They were both born in England – Eric Cobham from Poole and Maria Lindsey from Plymouth.

History

According to Philip Gosse in The Pirate's Who's Who (1924) and Horwood and Butts in The Pirates and Outlaws of Canada (1984), the Cobhams were among the first St. Lawrence pirates to become known for giving "no quarter," meaning all the captured crews were killed and the ships sunk. They were famous for their sadism and cruelty, including using survivors for target practice. They were pirates between 1720s–40s after which they relocated to Le Havre, France. They became members of the community and Eric was appointed a judge. Maria could not make the adjustment and went insane, finally committing suicide (or possibly being murdered by Eric). Eric had an attack of conscience after her death, confessed his sins to a priest, and requested the true story of his life be published. This book was printed after his death, the family tried to buy and destroy this book, however there is allegedly a copy in the Archives Nationales in Paris. They were survived by two sons and a daughter.

Possibility of hoax

Other than second hand mention, there is little proof on the ground that Cobham and his wife actually existed. It is extraordinarily unlikely that they could have had the career described in the mid-eighteenth century without leaving a single documentary trace. However, in a book, Buccaneers and Marooners of America, published in 1891, editor Howard Pyle mentions Cobham in passing as if his exploits were already well-known to the public at large and details Cobham's attack on a Spanish ship in the Bay of Biscay wherein all persons of Spanish origin (approximately 20) aboard the seized vessel were sewn into the mainsail and thrown into the sea.

References
Fitzgerald, Jack. The Hangman is Never Late
Gosse, Philip, "The Pirate's Who's Who"
Horwood, Harold, and Butts, Ed, "Pirates and Outlaws of Canada"
Rogozinski, Jan, "Pirates! An A-Z Encyclopedia"
Pyle, Howard, "Buccaneers and Marooners of America" 1891, 2nd Edition p. 20

External links
Buccaners and Marooners of America by Howard Pyle 1905
Article in the Canadian Encyclopedia

1700s births
1760 deaths
18th-century English people
18th-century English women
18th-century pirates
18th-century women
British mass murderers
British pirates
Lindsey, Maria
Married couples
People whose existence is disputed
Year of birth uncertain